Akindele is a surname of Yoruba origin  meaning "conquering warrior returns home". Notable people with the surname include:

Deji Akindele (born 1983), Nigerian basketball player
Funke Akindele (born 1976), Nigerian actress
Chief Labode Onadimaki Akindele, a Nigerian businessman, who was sued by the liquidators of BCCI in Bank of Credit and Commerce International (Overseas) Ltd v Akindele
Tesho Akindele (born 1992), Canadian footballer

Yoruba-language surnames
Surnames of Nigerian origin